Laura Zanazza (born 29 July 1982) is an Italian synchronized swimmer who competed in the 2004 Summer Olympics.

References

1982 births
Living people
Italian synchronized swimmers
Olympic synchronized swimmers of Italy
Synchronized swimmers at the 2004 Summer Olympics